Unfolding Object is a 2002 work of internet art created by John Simon after a commission from the Solomon R. Guggenheim Museum in New York City.  Along with net.flag by Mark Napier, it was among the first pieces of internet art to be collected by a major museum.

Simon has described Unfolding Object as "an endless book that rewrites itself and whose use dictates its content."  It begins as a blank square visible on a web page hosted on the museum's website, but responds when clicked by visitors to the site.  Gradually the square unfolds, click by click, until it reaches a certain point, after which it begins to close.  The "pages" of the design are programmed to respond differently as they receive more clicks; vertical, horizontal, and diagonal lines denote different numbers of previous clicks.  The colors of the square and of its background are both programmed to change hourly.

References
 Unfolding Object at the Guggenheim website

2002 works
Computer art
Digital art
2002 in art
Internet art